Eun-sang, also spelled Un-sang, is a Korean unisex given name. The meaning differs based on the hanja used to write each syllable of the name. There are 30 hanja with the reading "eun" and 43 hanja with the reading  "sang" on the South Korean government's official list of hanja which may be used in given names.

People with this name include:

Lee Eun-sang (poet) (1903–1982), Korean poet and historian
Lee Eun-sang (singer) (born 2002), South Korean singer, former member of X1

Fictional characters with this name include:

Cha Eun-sang, in 2013 South Korean television series The Heirs

See also
List of Korean given names

References

Korean unisex given names